Democratic Left Front (in Spanish: Frente Democrático de Izquierdas, FDI), was a left-wing political coalition in Spain. The coalition was formed by the Party of Labour of Spain (PTE), the Independent Socialist Party, Independent Socialist Bloc, Party of Communist Unification in the Canaries and Communist Unification of Spain (UCE) to participate in the 1977 general elections. Most of those parties were still illegal at the time of the election. FDI presented lists in all Spain, except in Catalonia, were the PTE ran in a coalition with Republican Left of Catalonia (ERC), called Left of Catalonia–Democratic Electoral Front (EC-FED). The coalition failed to win any seat (although their Catalan counterparts won one in Barcelona), and dissolved shortly afterwards.

Results

References

Gonzalo Wilhelmi: Romper el consensp. La izquierda radical en la Transición (1975–1982). Siglo XXI Editores, Madrid, 2016, .

1977 establishments in Spain
Defunct communist parties in Spain
Defunct political party alliances in Spain
Political parties established in 1977
Political parties with year of disestablishment missing